Jamaica Anansi Stories is a book by Martha Warren Beckwith published in 1924.  It is a collection of folklore, riddles and transcriptions of folk music, all involving the trickster Anansi, gathered from Jamaicans of African descent.

External links 
Jamaica Anansi Stories (entire text)

1924 books
African mythology
Mythology books
Caribbean mythology